Gene Roddenberry (August 19, 1921 – October 24, 1991) was an American screenwriter and producer of several television series, best known for his work in creating the Star Trek franchise. Before his television writing career, he was a pilot in the 394th Bomb Squadron, 5th Bombardment Group of the Thirteenth Air Force during World War II. During his time in the military, he flew the Boeing B-17 Flying Fortress, and was awarded both the Air Medal and the Distinguished Flying Cross. While working in the Los Angeles Police Department after the war, he began his television writing career, but resigned to concentrate on screenwriting. His first writing award was for an episode of Have Gun – Will Travel entitled "Helen of Abajinan" which won the Writers Guild of America award for Best Teleplay in 1958. In 1964, he registered the idea with the Writers Guild which would define the rest of his career—Star Trek.

The majority of the awards and nominations received by Roddenberry throughout his career were related to Star Trek. He was credited for Star Trek: The Original Series (known at the time simply as Star Trek) during the nominations for two Emmy Awards, and won two Hugo Awards. One Hugo was a special award for the series, while another was for "The Menagerie", the episode which used footage from the original unaired pilot for Star Trek, "The Cage". In addition, he was awarded the Brotherhood Award by the National Association for the Advancement of Colored People for his work in the advancement of African American characters on television.

At the 1967 Writers Guild of America Awards, a private feud between Roddenberry and writer Harlan Ellison entered the public eye, as Ellison had produced the original script for the episode "The City on the Edge of Forever". He was told to re-write it due to financial restraints, but could not bring it within budget. Instead, Roddenberry re-wrote the script for the episode, but Ellison retained the credit and subsequently submitted the original script for consideration by the Writers Guild. This was an unusual step as normally the filmed version of the script is the one that was submitted. Both "The City on the Edge of Forever" and "The Return of the Archons" were nominated for the Best Episodic Drama Award, with the latter written and credited to Roddenberry. Ellison won the award for his script. Roddenberry submitted the filmed version of "The City on the Edge of Forever" script for the Hugo Awards, winning in 1968, but the writing remained credited to Ellison. Roddenberry later claimed to have won a Nebula Award for the filmed version despite the Dramatic Presentation category not being created until 1974.

Following the end of Star Trek, he was nominated for Hugo Awards for two television movies, Genesis II and The Questor Tapes. In addition to awards, Roddenberry also received a star on the Hollywood Walk of Fame following a campaign by the fan clubs of Star Trek, which sought to have each fan donate a dollar towards the overall $3500 cost of upkeep. Following these donations, the Committee in charge of the Walk of Fame voted Roddenberry in. The star was unveiled on September 4, 1985, at the 6600 block, near to the corner of Hollywood Boulevard and Las Palmas. The induction ceremony was attended by all of the main cast of Star Trek, as well as Roger C. Carmel, who portrayed Harry Mudd in The Original Series. Following Roddenberry's death in 1991, he was posthumously awarded the Robert A. Heinlein Memorial Award by the National Space Society and The George Pal Memorial Award at the Saturn Awards. He was also awarded the Exceptional Public Service Medal by National Aeronautics and Space Administration (NASA).

Military awards

Civilian awards

Key
† Awarded posthumously

See also

Notes

References

Sources

External links
 

Lists of awards received by writer
Awards and nominations